Mammonart. An Essay on Economic Interpretation is a book of literary criticism from a Socialist point of view of the traditional "great authors" of Western and American literature (along with a few painters and composers). Mammonart was written by the prolific journalist, novelist and Socialist activist Upton Sinclair, and published in 1925.

Overview
The book is one of the "Dead Hand" series: six books Sinclair wrote on American institutions. The series also includes The Profits of Religion, The Brass Check (journalism), The Goose-step (higher education), The Goslings (elementary and high school education), and Money Writes! (literature). The term "Dead Hand" criticizes Adam Smith's concept that allowing an "invisible hand" of many people's individual self-interests to shape economic relations provides the best result for society as a whole. 

Sinclair intended Mammonart to be an alternative "textbook of culture" (p. 384). He says he expected it to soon be used as a textbook in Russian high schools, and hoped that it would be adopted by other European countries after they experienced Socialist revolutions. 

In each chapter, Sinclair critiques an artist according to his or her support for the rich and powerful. Most artists do not challenge the status quo and take positions such as 'art for art's sake' or 'art is entertainment.' In Sinclair's view, no matter how beautiful their work, by their passivity such artists perpetuate oppression and inequality.

For example, in the chapter on Shakespeare, entitled "Phosphorence and Decay," Sinclair praises the writer's glorious facility with words; however, this great talent "saved him from thinking." In contrast, Dickens' unique contribution was to "force into aristocratic and exclusive realms of art the revolutionary notion that the poor and degraded are equally as interesting as the rich and respectable." 

Mammonart is notable for Sinclair's repeated statement that all art, including his own, is propaganda. The popular distinction between propagandists like Jesus and Tolstoi, and  Shakespeare and Goethe, who are "pure and unsullied creative artists ... is purely a class distinction and a class weapon..." (p. 106)

The list of artists discussed is similar, though shorter, to a 1940 list of Great Books. Sinclair also includes writers of lesser importance who were included at the time in the American literary canon.

Artists discussed:

Homer
Aeschylus
Sophocles
Euripides
Aristophanes
Virgil
Horace
Juvenal
Boccaccio
Dante
Miguel de Cervantes
Michelangelo
Raphael
Shakespeare
John Milton
John Bunyan
John Dryden
Pierre Corneille
Jean Racine
Molière
Voltaire
Rousseau
Jonathan Swift
Samuel Richardson
Henry Fielding
Robert Burns
Beethoven
Goethe
Jane Austen
Sir Walter Scott
Samuel Taylor Coleridge
Robert Southey
William Wordsworth
John Keats
Honoré de Balzac
Victor Hugo
Théophile Gautier
Alfred de Musset
George Sand
Flaubert
Heinrich Heine
Richard Wagner
Thomas Carlyle
Alfred Lord Tennyson
Robert Browning
Matthew Arnold
Charles Dickens
William Makepeace Thackeray
John Ruskin
William Morris
Ralph Waldo Emerson
Henry Wadsworth Longfellow
John Greenleaf Whittier
Nathaniel Hawthorne
Edgar Allan Poe
Walt Whitman
Pushkin
Gogol
Turgenev
Dostoievski
Tolstoi
Goncourt brothers
Émile Zola
Guy De Maupassant
Henrik Ibsen
Strindberg
Nietzsche
Emile Verhaeren
Algernon Charles Swinburne
Oscar Wilde
James Abbott McNeill Whistler
George Meredith
Henry James
Mrs. Humphry Ward
Mark Twain
William Dean Howells
Ambrose Bierce
Richard Harding Davis
Stephen Crane
Frank Norris
David Graham Phillips
O. Henry
Jack London
Anatole France
Percy Bysshe Shelley

Mammonart was reprinted in paperback in 2003 by Simon Publications, .

Critical reception

Mammonart was read by undergraduates in the 1920s.

Mammonart has been mostly ignored by critics. Very few reviews are available from online scholarly databases.

Quotations

"All art is propaganda. It is universally and inescapably propaganda; sometimes unconsciously, but often deliberately, propaganda." (p. 9)

"Great art is produced when propaganda of vitality and importance is put across with technical competence in terms of the art selected." (p. 10) 

On his enjoyment of John Bunyan's Pilgrims Progress, "One does not escape the need of personal morality by espousing proletarian revolution." (p. 112)

External links

Sinclair's papers for Mammonart are at the Lilly Library, Indiana University, Bloomington, Indiana.

1925 books
Books by Upton Sinclair
Books of literary criticism
Self-published books
Dead Hand series